The women's 100 metres hurdles event at the 2003 Summer Universiade was held in Daegu, South Korea on 25–26 August.

Medalists

Results

Heats
Wind:Heat 1: +0.1 m/s, Heat 2: +0.1 m/s, Heat 3: +0.7 m/s

Final
Wind: -0.9 m/s

References
Results

Athletics at the 2003 Summer Universiade
2003 in women's athletics
2003